Hit Parade of 1947 is a 1947 American comedy film directed by Frank McDonald and written by Mary Loos. The film stars Eddie Albert, Constance Moore, Joan Edwards, Gil Lamb, Bill Goodwin and William Frawley. The film was released on March 22, 1947, by Republic Pictures.

Cast   
Eddie Albert as Kip Walker
Constance Moore as Ellen Baker
Joan Edwards as Joan
Gil Lamb as Eddie Page
Bill Goodwin as Rod Huntley
William Frawley as Harry Holmes
Richard Lane as Serial Director
Frank Fenton as Mr. Bonardi
Ralph Sanford as Small
Frank J. Scannell as Sammy 
Woody Herman and His Orchestra as Woody Herman Orchestra
Roy Rogers as Roy Rogers
Bob Nolan as Bob Nolan
Sons of the Pioneers as Sons of the Pioneers
Hugh Farr as Hugh Farr
Karl Farr as Karl Farr 
Tim Spencer as Tim Spencer 
Doye O'Dell as Doye O'Dell

References

External links 
 

1947 films
American comedy films
1947 comedy films
Republic Pictures films
Films directed by Frank McDonald
American black-and-white films
1940s English-language films
1940s American films